(Main list of acronyms)


 W 
 (s) Tungsten (from German Wolfram)
 (i) Watt
 (i) Wednesday
 (i) West
 (i) Games Won in sporting competitions

W0–9 
 W3C – (i) World Wide Web Consortium
 w/ – (p) With: Software w/Documentation. Typically used in advertising or to abbreviate headings. Never used in formal body text. (North America)

WA
 wa – (s) Walloon language (ISO 639-1 code)
 WA
 (s) Namibia (FIPS 10-4 country code; from West Africa)
 Washington state (postal symbol)
 Western Australia (postal symbol)
 (i) World Archery (Federation)
 World Athletics
 WAAC – (i) Women's Army Auxiliary Corps (Britain) (World War I UK)
 WAAF – (i) Women's Auxiliary Air Force (World War II UK)
 WAC
 (a) Western Athletic Conference
 (i) Women's Auxiliary Corps (World War II Canada)
 Women's Army Corps (World War II U.S.)
 WACC – (a) Weighted Average Cost of Capital (accounting)
 WACS – What-A-Cartoon! Show
 WAD – (a) Weapons Alert Designator
 WAGGGS – (a) World Association of Girl Guides and Girl Scouts
WAGMI - (a) We're All Gonna Make It
 WAGs – (p) Wives And Girlfriends (most notably of England national football team players at the 2006 FIFA World Cup, although the term existed earlier)
 WAK – (s) Wake Island (ISO 3166 trigram, obsolete 1986)
 WAL – see entry
 WAN – (a) Wide area network
 WAP – (a) Wireless Application Protocol
 WAPIMA – (a) What a pain in my ass
 WAR – (a) With All Respect
 WAsP – (p) Short form of WAAAAP (Wind Atlas Analysis and Application Program)
 WASP
 (a) White Anglo-Saxon Protestant
 Wide Angle Search for Planets
 Women Airforce Service Pilots
 WAYP – (a)  White And Yellow Pages

WB
 Wb – (s) Weber
 WB
(i) Warner Bros.
Welcome Back (Internet shorthand)
 WBA
 (i) Warner Bros. Animation
 West Bromwich Albion (F.C.)
 World Boxing Association
 WBC – (i) World Boxing Council
 WBE – (i) Work Breakdown Element
 WBO – (i) World Boxing Organization
 WbW 
 with best wishes
 white boy wasted

WC
 WC – (i) Water Closet – Winston Churchill – World Cup (sports)
 WCBO – (i) World Chess Boxing Organisation
 WCBP – (i) World Center for Birds of Prey
 WCCW – (i) World Class Championship Wrestling
 WCL – (i) World Confederation of Labour
 WCS – (i) Weapon Control Status – Wildlife Conservation Society
 WCW – (i) World Championship Wrestling

WD
 WDC – (i) Western Design Center – World Data Center
 WDWR – Walt Disney World Resort
 WDIN – Wildlife Disease Information Node

WE
 WEBS – (a) Weapon Effectiveness Battle Simulation
 WEC – (i) World Extreme Cagefighting
 WEEE – (i) Waste Electrical and Electronic Equipment
 WEF – (a) World Economic Forum
 WEIRD – (a) Western, educated, industrialized, rich, democratic (cultural identifier of a disproportionate number of psychology test subjects) 
 WEM - (a) West Edmonton Mall
 WEU – (i) Western European Union
 WEZ – (a/i) Weapon Engagement Zone

WF
 WF – (s) Wallis and Futuna Islands (ISO 3166 digram)
 WFC – (i) Women's Forage Corps (World War I UK)
 WFD – (i) Weapon(s) of Focused Destruction
 WFF – (i) Wallops Flight Facility
 WFI - Water for Injection
 WFP – (i) World Food Program
 WFT – (i) Washington Football Team (former NFL franchise name)
 WFZ – (i) Weapons Free Zone

WG
 WG – (i) Working Group – Wade–Giles
 WGS 84 – World Geodetic System 1984
 WGSRPD
World Geographical Scheme for Recording Plant Distributions
an international biogeography based standardized placename system for flora + floristics locations.

WH
 WH – (i) Wehrmacht Heer (German World War II army vehicle licence plate code)
 WHAM – (a) Wisconsin Hydrogen-Alpha Mapping (telescope)
 WHI – (i) Women's Health Initiative
 WHIP – (a) Walks plus hits per inning pitched
 WHO – (a) World Health Organization
 WHS – (i) (U.S.) Washington Headquarters Services

WI
 WI
 (s) Western Sahara (FIPS 10-4 country code)
 Wisconsin (postal symbol)
 (i) Women's Institute
 WIA
 (i) Wounded In Action
 (a) Wireless Institute of Australia (Amateur Radio)
 WIIFM - (i) What's in it for me?
 WIE- (a) Windows Internet Explorer
 WIMP
 (a) Weakly Interacting Massive Particle
 Windows, Icons, Menus, Pointers
 WIN-T – (i) Warfighter Information Network-Tactical
 WIPO – (a/i) World Intellectual Property Organization
 WIPP – (a) [Nuclear] Waste Isolation Pilot Plant
 WIYN – (i) Wisconsin Indiana Yale NOAO telescope consortium

WJ
 WJKK WJKF – Waheguru Ji Ka Khalsa, Waheguru Ji Ke Fateh, a Sikh greeting

WK
 WK – (s) Wake Island (ISO 3166 digram, obsolete 1986)
 WKYP – (a) Will Keep You Posted
 WKX – (a) World Kickboxing Xtrm

WL
 WL – (i) Wehrmacht Luftwaffe (German World War II air force vehicle licence plate code)
 WLB – (i) Women's Land Brigade (World War II Canada)
 WLF – (s) Wallis and Futuna Islands (ISO 3166 trigram)
 wln – (s) Walloon language (ISO 639-2 code)
 WLOG – (i) Without Loss Of Generality (see WOLOG)

WM
 WM – (i) Wehrmacht Marine (German World War II navy vehicle licence plate code)
 WMANUS – (a) West Midlands Area National Union of Students
 WMD
(i) Weapon[s] of Mass Destruction
World Movement for Democracy †
 WMI – (i) Wildlife Management Institute
 WMO – (i) World Meteorological Organization

WN
 WNA – (i) World Nuclear Association
 WNBA – (i) Women's National Basketball Association
 WNF – (i) "Will Not Fix"
 WNL - (i) Medical initialism for "Within Normal Limits"
 WNIT – (i) Women's National Invitation Tournament
 WNSD – (i) What's New, Scooby-Doo?
 WNW – (s) West North-West

WO
 wo – (s) Wolof language (ISO 639-1 code)
 WO – (i) Warrant Officer
 W/O – (p) Without: Software w/o Documentation
 w/o – Weight per cent
 WOF - Width of Fabric
 WOFT – (a) Waste Of Fucking Time
 WOFTAM – (a) Waste Of Fucking Time And Money
 WOI – (a/i) Wheels Of Italy
 wol – (s) Wolof language (ISO 639-2 code)
 WOLOG (or WLOG) – (a/i) WithOut Loss Of Generality
 WOM – (a) Write Only Memory
 WOS – (i) Wilson Ornithological Society
 WOSM
 (i) World Organization of the Scout Movement
 Worldwide Oil Spill Model
 WOT – (i) Waste Of Time
 WoW or WOW – (a) World of Warcraft

WP
 WP 
 (i) White Phosphorus (ammunition)
 (i) Workers' Party (Singapore)
 WPB – (i) War Production Board during World War II
 WPE – (i) World Pork Expo
 WPK – (p) Wider Peacekeeping
 WPT – (i) World Poker Tour – World Premiere Toons
 WPP - (i) Witness Protection Program

WQ
 WQS – World Qualifying series (surf)

WR
 WR – (i) Wide Receiver (football)
 WRAC – (a) Women's Royal Army Corps (World War II UK)
 WRAIR – (a) Walter Reed Army Institute of Research
 WRBWWRM – (i) "We Read Best What We Read Most"
 WRC – (i) World Rally Championship
 WRC - World Religions Conference
 WRNS – (i) Women's Royal Naval Service (World War II UK) (pronounced "wrens")
 WRVS – (i) Women's Royal Voluntary Service, now only known by the acronym (UK)
 WRS – (i) Worldwide Reference System
 wrt or w/r/t – (i) with respect to or with regard to, depending on context
 WRT
 (i) Writer Response Theory
 (i) WRT - "With respect to", especially in fields such as Mathematics.
 (i) World Rally Team
 (i) Wallace Roberts & Todd, LLC (Urban Planning and Design)
 (i) Wireless Ronin Technologies (digital signage)
 (i) NHS Workforce Review Team
 The Linksys routers whose model name start with 'WRT'
 (i) Wholesale, Trade, Retail sector, category in employment and economics statistics
 (i) Wireless Receiver/Transmitter ( computer networks/IT )
 Third party firmware for the Linksys WRT routers and compatible models from other vendors.
 (i) Web Runtime (WRT) is a portable application framework developed by Nokia that allows the creation of widgets on the S60 Platform.

WS
 WS
 (s) Samoa (ISO 3166 and FIPS 10-4 country code digram; from the country's former name of Western Samoa)
 (i) Writer to the Signet (a Scottish solicitor)
 WSC – (i) Weapon System Catalogue
 WSDL – (i) Web Services Description Language
 WSJ – (i) (The) Wall Street Journal
 WSL
 (i) White Star Line (shipping company)
 Women's Super League, currently used to describe England's top women's association football league and formerly to describe that country's top women's rugby union competition
 Workers' Socialist League (UK political party)
 WSM
 (s) Samoa (ISO 3166 trigram; from Western Samoa)
 (i) Winchester Short Magnum (family of rifle cartridges)
 WSMR – (a/i) White Sands Missile Range ("whiz-murr")
 WSROC – (a) Western Sydney Regional Organisation of Councils
 WSSM – (i) Winchester Super Short Magnum (family of rifle cartridges)
 WST
 (i) Water Soluble Tetrazolium (assay)
 (s) Samoan tālā (ISO 4217 currency code)
 WSTC – (i) Women Signallers Territorial Corps (World War II UK)
 WSUS – Windows Server Update Services
 WSW – (s) West South-West

WT
 WTA – (i) Women's Tennis Association (cf. WTA Tour, operated by this body)
 WTB
 (i) Wales Tourism Board
 Warenterminbörse Hannover
 WTB – (i) Want to Buy (a commonly used phrase in various online games and buy/sell messageboards)
 WTC – (i) World Trade Center
 WTF – (i) What the f**k?; also What a Terrible Failure (android)
 WTFH – (i) What The F**king Hell
 WTH – (i) What the Hell
 WTNWD – (i) Wait To Next Working Day (a commonly used phrase to maintain work life balance)
 WTO – (i) World Trade Organization
 WTS – (i) Want to Sell (a commonly used phrase in various online games and buy/sell messageboards)

WU
 WU – (i) Wabash University – Washington University in St. Louis – Western Union – Windows Update – Work unit – WU Wien (German Wirtschaftsuniversität Wien, Vienna University of Economics and Business Administration)
 WUU2 – What you up to – Internet slang popular with teenagers.
 WUBU2 –  What you been up to

WV
 WV – (s) West Virginia (postal symbol)
 WVA – (i) World Veterinary Association
 WVIAC – (i) West Virginia Intercollegiate Athletic Conference
 WVR – (i) Women's Volunteer Reserve (World War II UK)
 WVSC – (i) Women's Volunteer Service Corps (World War II Canada)
 WVU – (i) West Virginia University
 WVUIT – (i) West Virginia University Institute of Technology (note, however, that the initialism is almost never used; the popular name of the school is "WVU Tech")

WW
 WW – see entry
 WWE – (i) World Wrestling Entertainment
 WWF
 (i) World Wide Fund for Nature, from its original name of World Wildlife Fund, which remains the legal name in the U.S. and Canada
 World Wrestling Federation
 WWI – (i) World War I
 WWII – (i) World War II
 WWIII – (i) World War III
 WWJD – (i) "What would Jesus do?"
 WWS – (i) Wheaton Warrenville South High School
 WWV – (i) Wagner-Werk-Verzeichnis (catalog of the works of Richard Wagner, and callsign of NIST's shortwave radio station in Fort Collins, Colorado)
 WWW – (i) World Wide Web
 WWWF – (i) World Wide Wrestling Federation

WX
 WXO – (i) Weather [Executive] Officer

WY
WY – (s) Wyoming (postal symbol)
WYSIWYG – (a) What You See Is What You Get (pronounced "wizzy-wig". See entry for derived acronyms)
WYSIWYP – (a) What You See Is What You Print / What You See Is What You Pay ("wizzy-whip")
WYRFTTM – When You Are Free Talk To Me

WZ
WZ – (s) Eswatini (FIPS 10-4 country code)

Acronyms W